First United Methodist Church is a historic Methodist church at the junction of Prince and Clifton Street in Conway, Arkansas.  It is a two story brick building with Classical Revival style, set on a raised foundation.  The building is basically rectangular in shape, but its main roof is cruciform, with gables on all for sides, and a dome at the center.  The front has a fully pedimented six-column Classical portico, with an entablature and dentillated pediment with a small round window at its center.  The church was designed by George W. Kramer of New York City, and built in 1913 for a Methodist congregation founded in 1871.

The building was listed on the National Register of Historic Places in 1992.

See also
National Register of Historic Places listings in Faulkner County, Arkansas

References

External links
Official website

United Methodist churches in Arkansas
Churches on the National Register of Historic Places in Arkansas
Neoclassical architecture in Arkansas
Churches completed in 1913
Churches in Faulkner County, Arkansas
1913 establishments in Arkansas
National Register of Historic Places in Faulkner County, Arkansas
Individually listed contributing properties to historic districts on the National Register in Arkansas
Buildings and structures in Conway, Arkansas
Neoclassical church buildings in the United States